Berndnaut Smilde (Groningen, 1978) is a Dutch visual artist.

Early life
Berndnaut Smilde was born in 1978 in Groningen. In 2005, Smilde graduated with a master's degree in fine art from the Frank Mohr Institute of Hanze University in Groningen.

Career
Smilde's best known works include the series Conditioner; sculptures that spread an antiseptic scent throughout several rooms, and Unflattened, which shows an inverted rainbow.

In 2012 he created a series of self-made clouds, of which Nimbus II, 2012, first performed in the Lady Chapel of Hoorn, was included in London's Saatchi Gallery. He chooses locations that are old, damp, that have no air circulation. Time magazine called this technique one of the fifty best inventions of 2012.

Exhibitions
 Process Room (2008)
 Irish Museum of Modern Art (2008)
 Bunker Project (2010)
 Galerie West (2010)
 The Hague (2010)
 Bonnefantenmuseum, Maastricht (2013)
 Ronchini Gallery, London (2014)
 LIAN Contemporary Art Space, Shanghai (2015)

Group shows
 Galerie Boven de Bank (2001)
 Groningen (2001)
 Nofound Photo Fair, Paris (2012)
 Saatchi Gallery, London, (2012)
 Art 13, London (2013)
 Somarts, San Francisco (2013)
 FotoMuseum, Antwerp, (2015)
 Museum Kranenburgh, (2016)
 RWA Bristol, (2017)
 Saatchi Gallery, London (2017)

Awards
Smilde won a stipend from the Netherlands Foundation for Visual Arts.

Sources

External links 
 
 Recordings of the Clouds

1978 births
Living people
21st-century Dutch sculptors
Dutch male sculptors
People from Groningen (city)